J. M. Wedderburn (fl. before 1812) was a Newcastle songwriter, who, according to the information given by John Bell in his Rhymes of Northern Bards published in 1812, has the song "Nanny of the Tyne" attributed to this name.

The song was set to music by J Aldridge (Junior) of Newcastle. It is not written in Geordie dialect but has a strong Northern connection,

However, in The Tyne Songster, produced by W & T Fordyce in 1840, "Nanny of the Tyne" is attributed to "Gibson" (with no Christian name).

The same song, "Nanny of the Tyne", appears on page 334 of Songs of the Bards of the Tyne produced by P. France & Co. c. 1850, again attributed to "J. Gibson"  - and  also on page 17 of Volume 7 of The Songs of the Tyne produced by John Ross c. 1846, but in this book it is not attributed to any writer.

Nothing more appears to be known of this person, not even the Christian name, or their sex.

See also 
Geordie dialect words<br/ >
Rhymes of Northern Bards<br/ >
The Songs of the Tyne by Ross<br/ >
The Tyne Songster by W & T Fordyce - 1840<br/ >
France's Songs of the Bards of the Tyne - 1850

References

External links
 The Tyne Songster

18th-century births
Year of death missing
English songwriters
English poets
People from Newcastle upon Tyne (district)
Musicians from Tyne and Wear
Geordie songwriters